Aeroflot Flight 6551 ( Reys 6551 Aeroflota) was a scheduled domestic passenger flight on an Ilyushin Il-18B from Baku to Novosibirsk with a stopover in Tashkent that crashed on 11 May 1973 over Semipalatinsk in the Kazakh SSR, killing all 63 people aboard.

Aircraft 
The aircraft involved in the accident was an Ilyushin Il-18B registered CCCP-75687 to the Azerbaijan division of Aeroflot.  Built in 1959, by the time of the accident the aircraft had sustained 21,663 flight hours and 11,787 pressurization cycles. Initially the cabin layout was designed to seat 80 passengers but later seats were rearranged to seat an additional nine passengers.

Crew 
Eight crew members were aboard the flight.  The cockpit crew consisted of:
 Captain – Viktor Sergeyevich Loginov 
 Co-pilot – Yuri Aleksandrovich Filin
 Flight engineer – Valentin Nikolayevich Pershin
 Navigator – Viktor Mikhaylovich Filatov
 Radio operator – Dmitry Korneyevich Markin

Synopsis 
The flight departed from Tashkent Airport on the May 10 at 23:25 Moscow time (01:25 May 11 local time) with 63 people on board, including three children. At 01:12 MSK the flight  briefly contacted the Ayaguz airport controller and again at 01:22 to inform him they were about to depart the Ayaguz sector and head over to Semipalatinsk. The Semipalatinsk controller attempted to make contact with the plane when it was due to be overhead at 01:52 MSK (04:52 local time) but received no response from the flight.

Investigators were able to reach the wreckage and view the burning debris by 04:50 local time, but all 63 people on the flight perished in the crash.

Conclusions 
Two local military units questioned by investigators reported that they had not fired any projectiles into the air around the time of the crash nor were there any air force aircraft in operation that could have collided with the flight. Investigators felt that the first altitude and speed of the 20–30 seconds of reduced altitude correlated with a controlled emergency reduction in altitude, followed by an unexplainable loss of control that led to an overspeed situation. Investigators thought that one of the reasons possible would have been a crew member unintentionally losing control of an elevator during an emergency descent, but it could not be conclusively confirmed. At the time of the rapid decline that led up to the accident, the propellers were feathered, but it is unknown if the crew had done so or if the autopilot had done so.

Two round puncture holes in the fuselage of the rear luggage compartment; investigators had the portion of the compartment recovered and sent for analysis to see if an artillery shell could have caused the damage, but analysis concluded that the holes resulted from the crash itself with a lack of explosive residues present. Despite the recovery of the flight data recorders and most of the wreckage, the commission was not able to pinpoint an exact cause of the crash, in part due to the amount of damage sustained by the flight data recorders limiting the amount of information that could be recovered.

See also 

 List of accidents and incidents involving the Ilyushin Il-18
 Aeroflot Flight 5484
 Aeroflot Flight 630

References  

Aviation accidents and incidents in 1973
Aviation accidents and incidents in the Soviet Union
6551
1973 in the Soviet Union
Accidents and incidents involving the Ilyushin Il-18
May 1973 events in Europe
Airliner accidents and incidents with an unknown cause